The Kid is a 2016 historical western novel written by Ron Hansen. It is about the iconic American criminal and legendary outlaw of the old West Billy the Kid, and the Lincoln County War in New Mexico.

According to Publishers Weekly, The Kid is "entertaining and lively…an excellent, transportive read".

References

2016 American novels
Novels about outlaws of the American Old West
Historical novels
Cultural depictions of Billy the Kid
Western (genre) novels
Charles Scribner's Sons books